Hasanabad-e Emam (also Romanized as Ḩasanābād-e Emām; also known as Ḩasanābād and Ḩasanābād-e Afshār) is a village in Chaharduli Rural District, in the Central District of Asadabad County, Hamadan Province, Iran. At the 2006 census, its population was 544, in 120 families.

References 

Populated places in Asadabad County